Saleh Ahmed Mohammed Saleh Al-Khamees famously known by his nickname Saleh Zakaria is a Kuwaiti professional football manager.

Career
In 1978 and 1986 he coached the Kuwait national football team. Since December 2006 until June 2007 he was a head coach of the Kuwait team.

References

External links
Profile at Soccerway.com
Profile at Soccerpunter.com

Living people
Kuwaiti football managers
Kuwait national football team managers
Place of birth missing (living people)
1943 births
Kuwait Premier League players
Kuwait Premier League managers
Kuwait SC players
Kuwait SC managers
Al Jahra SC managers
Qadsia SC managers
Al-Salmiya SC managers
Kuwait international footballers
Kuwaiti footballers
Association footballers not categorized by position